Based in Damascus until 2016, the SCPR, which is regarded as one of the most reliable local sources for information about the Syrian civil war since it is unaffiliated with any government or opposition group, estimated the number of dead due to the war as 470,000, as of 2016. The study asserts that the dead include civilians and combatants, and states that as many as two million people were injured. The study also stated that during the years of the war between 2011 and 2016 over 6 million Syrian refugees tried to escape the violence.

Strategic objectives
According to the SCPR, objectives include helping people in Syria to better initiate and engage in an open, respectful, and informed dialogue on key issues of public policy.

References

External links
 

Research institutes in Syria
Syrian civil war